Isthmohyla picadoi is a species of frog in the family Hylidae.
It is found in Costa Rica and Panama.
Its natural habitat is subtropical or tropical moist montane forests.
It is threatened by habitat loss.

References

Isthmohyla
Amphibians described in 1937
Taxonomy articles created by Polbot